Big Deal is a British comedy-drama television series originally broadcast by the BBC between 1984 and 1986. The series was created and written by Geoff McQueen, who created several other major television series including Give Us a Break, Stay Lucky, and The Bill.

Starring Ray Brooks, Sharon Duce and Lisa Geoghan, the series concentrated on the ups and downs of small-time London gambler Robbie Box (played by Brooks) and the effect that his poker addiction has on his long suffering girlfriend Jan Oliver (Duce) and her daughter Debby (Geoghan).

The theme music was by Bucks Fizz member Bobby G.

Cast

Ray Brooks – Robbie Box
Sharon Duce – Jan Oliver
Lisa Geoghan – Debby Oliver
Pamela Cundell – Vi Box
James Ottaway – Tommy
Andy Mulligan – Geordie
Kenneth Waller – Ferret
Deirdre Costello – Joan
Stephen Tate – Dick Mayer
Frank Mills – Gil Roach
Alex Tetteh-Lartey – Black George
Roger Walker – Kipper
Tony Caunter – Henry Diamond

Series Overview

Episodes

Series 1

Series 2

Series 3

DVD releases
Series 1 of Big Deal was released on DVD by the BBC on 24 July 2006.

References

External links
 

BBC television dramas
1980s British drama television series
1984 British television series debuts
1986 British television series endings
English-language television shows